Severe Tropical Storm Brendan, also known in the Philippines as Tropical Storm Helming, was a third consecutive tropical cyclone to strike China in July 1991. A weak surface circulation developed near Carolina Islands in July 15. Tracking west-northwestward, the circulation organized into a tropical depression in July 19. The tropical depression intensified into Tropical Storm Brendan in July 21 when the depression approached Philippines. Brendan quickly intensified to reach the first peak intensity of  when it made landfall in Luzon, Philippines. After making landfall, Brendan weakened and dissipated later that day.

Around 10,000 people were forced to evacuate and approximately 1400 houses were destroyed by the rising mudflow. Four deaths are recorded in the country. In Hong Kong, Brendan caused 17 injuries. These people were hit by glass pieces and objects that were blown away by the storm. Overall damages across Hong Kong was estimated to be HK$0.94 million, mostly from public utilities. In Macau, severe flooding are reported in low-lying areas. Two fishermen from China reported missing southwest of Macau after the storm capsized their boats. In Guangdong, the storm killed two people and injured four others. 64 houses were destroyed and 1,019 others were damaged. Total losses were estimated to be ¥1.32 billion (US$247 million). In Guangxi, the storm killed 28 people and injured 189 others. About 2,100 houses were destroyed and 16,000 others are damaged. Total losses were estimated to be ¥25 million ($4.68 million).

Meteorological history

Around the same time, JMA upgraded the system into a tropical depression. However, due to diurnal fluctuations that affected the system's convection, JTWC reissued the TCFA at 18:00 UTC on August 20, 1991. Later that morning, satellite imagery showed significant organization within the system. Coupled with a low shear environment and warm sea surface temperatures, JTWC declared the system a tropical depression in the 00:00 UTC of August 21. As the depression continued to develop six hours later, based on a Dvorak intensity estimate of T2.5/, the JTWC upgraded the tropical depression into a tropical storm and was given the name Brendan. JMA also upgraded the depression into a tropical storm at the same time.

Impacts

Philippines
Around 10,000 people were forced to evacuate and approximately 1400 houses were destroyed by the rising mudflow. Four deaths are recorded in the country.

Hong Kong
In Hong Kong, Brendan caused 17 injuries. These people were hit by glass pieces and objects that were blown away by the storm. Overall damages across Hong Kong was estimated to be HK$0.94 million, mostly from public utilities.

Macau
In Macau, severe flooding are reported in low-lying areas. Two fishermen from China reported missing southwest of Macau after the storm capsized their boats.

Mainland China
In Guangdong, the storm killed two people and injured four others. 64 houses were destroyed and 1,019 others were damaged. Total losses were estimated to be ¥1.32 billion (US$247 million). In Guangxi, the storm killed 28 people and injured 189 others. About 2,100 houses were destroyed and 16,000 others are damaged. Total losses were estimated to be ¥25 million ($4.68 million).

See also

Tropical Storm Nida (2016)

Notes

References

1991 Pacific typhoon season
Typhoons in the Philippines
Typhoons in China
1991 in China
Typhoons in Hong Kong